Vahdat is a city in Tajikistan.

Vahdat or Vakhdat may also refer to the following places:
in Iran:
Vahdat, Kermanshah, a village in Iran
Vahdat, Khuzestan, a village in Iran
Vahdat, Kohgiluyeh and Boyer-Ahmad, a village in Iran
Vahdat Rural District (Kerman Province), an administrative subdivision of Kerman Province, Iran
Vahdat Rural District (Kohgiluyeh and Boyer-Ahmad Province), an administrative subdivision of Kohgiluyeh and Boyer-Ahmad Province, Iran
in Tajikistan:
Vahdat District, a district in Tajikistan's Region of Republican Subordination
Vahdat Palace or Palace of Unity, a convention center in Tajikistan's capital Dushanbe
Vahdat, Gorno-Badakhshan (formerly: Midenshor), a village in Shughnon District, Gorno-Badakhshan Autonomous Region
Vahdat, Lakhsh District (formerly: Jirgatol), a town in Lakhsh District
Vahdat, Sughd, an administrative division in Devashtich District, Sughd Region
Vahdat, Shahriston District, a village in Shahriston District, Sughd Region